The Toys Sing “A Lover's Concerto” and “Attack!” is the sole album by the girl group The Toys.  It was released in 1966 right after the success of the group's first two hits, both of which are mentioned in the album's title.

“Yesterday” is the only cover song on the album. The rest of the tracks are all original material that were written by the Toys' producers, Sandy Linzer and Denny Randell.

Although Barbara Harris sang lead for the majority of the album (the group's producers felt that her voice was the most commercial), Barbara Parritt and June Montiero are each given a chance to sing lead as well, the former on “Hallelujah” and the latter on “Yesterday”.  Parritt and Harris share the lead vocal duties on "Back Street."

The album was re-released on November 1, 1994 on CD by Sundazed Records.  The CD version was produced by Bob Irwin and included two bonus tracks (“Baby Toys” and “May My Heart Be Cast into Stone”), both of which were released as singles following the album.  According to Barbara Harris, these two songs were intended to be featured on The Toys' second album, which was never released.

Track listing
All tracks composed by Sandy Linzer and Denny Randell; except where indicated

CD bonus tracks
"Baby Toys" (Sandy Linzer, Denny Randell, Decilis, Layton) - 3:11
"May My Heart Be Cast into Stone" - 2:41

Album credits
Produced by: Sandy Linzer and Denny Randell for Bob Crewe Productions
CD version produced by: Bob Irwin

Album - Billboard (United States)

Singles - Billboard (United States)

1966 debut albums
The Toys albums
DynoVoice Records albums